Dubai Aluminium Co Ltd v Salaam [2002] UKHL 48 is an English vicarious liability case, concerning also breach of trust and dishonest assistance.

Facts
Salaam's solicitors were seeking contribution for damages because of their former client. Mr Salaam had defrauded Dubai Aluminium Co Ltd. Mr Salaam's solicitors were Amhurst Brown Martin & Nicholson, and they had drafted documents for him. Amhurst's had been sued and had settled a $10m claim. Then, they sought contribution from Mr Salaam under the Civil Liability (Contribution) Act 1978. This required showing that Amhurst's was liable for wrongful acts by Mr Anthony Amhurst, under the Partnership Act 1890 section 10.

Judgment

Court of Appeal
The majority of the Court of Appeal, Evans LJ and Aldous LJ, held that the firm was not vicariously liable for the dishonest acts of Mr Salaam, and so was not entitled to a contribution from Mr Salaam for settling the claim by Dubai Aluminium.

Turner J dissented. Mr Salaam argued that wrongful acts that a partnership was vicariously liable for only extended to common law torts, not equitable wrongs like dishonest participation in a breach of trust. Jonathan Sumption QC acted for the solicitors.

House of Lords
The House of Lords held that Amhurst's was entitled to a contribution (which amounted to indemnity) from Mr Salaam. The 1890 Act was not restricted to tortious wrongs, and Mr Amhurst's actions were in the ordinary course of the business (Lister v Hesley Hall Ltd). So the firm was jointly liable for the damage, and Rix J had been wrong to take account of the firm's innocence when assessing Mr Salaam's contribution for a settlement. Given that Mr Salaam still possessed the proceeds of fraud it was equitable for him to pay the surplus for the firm's $10m liability.

Lord Nicholls gave the first judgment and said the following on vicarious liability:

Lord Millett gave a concurring judgment. In obiter dicta he said that the claim could be based on dishonesty, like for liability in assisting breach of trust. At the same time it could ‘be based simply on the receipt, treating it as a restitutionary claim independent of any wrongdoing.’

Lord Hobhouse gave a short concurring judgment.

Lord Slynn agreed with Lord Nicholls.

Lord Hutton agreed with Lord Nicholls and Lord Millett.

See also

Notes

English trusts case law